Joshua Kaleb Samman (March 14, 1988 – October 5, 2016) was an American mixed martial artist who, at the time of his death, competed in the Middleweight division of the Ultimate Fighting Championship, and also competed for Bellator MMA.

Mixed martial arts career

Early career
Following amateur MMA fights in 2006, Samman made his professional MMA debut in 2007.  Over the next five years, he amassed a record of 9 wins and 2 losses before joining the cast of The Ultimate Fighter.

The Ultimate Fighter
In January 2013, it was revealed that Samman was a cast member of The Ultimate Fighter: Team Jones vs. Team Sonnen.  He won his preliminary bout over Leo Bercier via TKO in the first round.  However, he drew the ire of both coaches and Dana White for what they perceived to be showboating during his bout.  Samman was selected by coach Jones as his second pick (fourth overall).

In the next round, Samman defeated Tor Troéng by knockout in the first round.  In the quarter final round, Samman defeated Jimmy Quinlan via submission in the first round.  In the semi-finals, he faced eventual tournament winner Kelvin Gastelum.  Despite being considered a heavy favorite by both coaches, Samman was quickly taken down by Gastelum and eventually submitted in the first round.

Ultimate Fighting Championship
On April 9, 2013, it was announced that Samman would face fellow season 17 alumni Kevin Casey at The Ultimate Fighter 17 Finale. After a close first round, Samman won the fight via TKO in the second round.

Samman was to replace Nick Ring against his former The Ultimate Fighter 17 rival Uriah Hall on August 17, 2013, at UFC Fight Night 26. However, on July 17, he was taken out of the bout after an undisclosed injury.

Samman was expected to face Caio Magalhães on April 19, 2014, at UFC on Fox 11 but was forced to withdraw after tearing his left hamstring.

Samman faced Eddie Gordon on December 6, 2014, at UFC 181. After losing the first round, he came back in the second round to land a left switch head kick on Gordon, knocking him out in what was considered one of the best knockouts of 2014. Samman's knockout earned him his first Performance of the Night bonus award.

Samman faced Caio Magalhães on July 12, 2015, at The Ultimate Fighter 21 Finale. He won the fight via rear naked choke in the first round which also earned a Performance of the Night bonus.

Samman faced returning veteran Tamdan McCrory on December 19, 2015, at UFC on Fox 17.  He lost the back-and-forth fight via submission in the third round.

Samman next faced Tim Boetsch on July 13, 2016, at UFC Fight Night 91. He lost the fight via TKO in the second round.

Literary work

Samman is the author of The Housekeeper: Love, Death, and Prizefighting, which chronicles his struggles with addiction; career-threatening injuries and the death of his girlfriend.

Samman was a long time contributor to SB Nation's website Bloody Elbow, and in August 2014, Samman started submitting Fanposts regularly to the website.
In March 2015, BloodyElbow.com announced that Samman would become officially part of the staff and would be joining the website as a feature author.

Samman was also a columnist for UFC.com. In May 2016, Samman announced he would be contributing to an additional MMA website, flocombat.com.

Combat Night

In 2009, Samman began promoting a Mixed Martial Arts event in Tallahassee, Florida, dubbed “Ubersmash,” which featured Samman as the headliner and other local fighters on the bill. When Florida legislation passed that allowed for the creation of amateur MMA sanctioning bodies, Samman and his business partner immediately set out to create Combat Night, which has since expanded to Jacksonville, Orlando, and Miami to become the largest MMA organization in the state.

On Saturday, September 26, 2015, Samman and his business partner celebrated a successful 50th edition of Combat Night, drawing 4,000 fans to an amateur MMA show in Tallahassee, Florida.

Personal life
On August 30, 2013, Samman's girlfriend Hailey Bevis died in a single-car accident while the two were texting each other.

On September 29, 2016, Samman and a friend, Troy Kirkingburg, were found unresponsive in a South Florida apartment due to a drug overdose. His friend, an MMA announcer for a local Florida promotion, was pronounced dead from an overdose of cocaine, heroin and pain killers upon arrival at the hospital, while Samman remained in critical condition and in a coma. Samman died on October 5, 2016.

Championships and accomplishments

Mixed martial arts
Ultimate Fighting Championship
Performance of the Night (Two times) vs. Eddie Gordon and Caio Magalhães
MMAJunkie.com
2014 December Knockout of the Month vs. Eddie Gordon

Mixed martial arts record

|-
|Loss
|align=center|12–4
|Tim Boetsch
|TKO (punches)
|UFC Fight Night: McDonald vs. Lineker
|
|align=center|2
|align=center|3:49
|Sioux Falls, South Dakota, United States
|
|-
|Loss
|align=center|12–3
|Tamdan McCrory
|Submission (triangle choke)
|UFC on Fox: dos Anjos vs. Cowboy  2 
|
|align=center|3
|align=center|4:10
|Orlando, Florida, United States
|
|-
|Win
|align=center|12–2
|Caio Magalhães
|Submission (rear-naked choke)
|The Ultimate Fighter: American Top Team vs. Blackzilians Finale
|
|align=center|1
|align=center|2:52
|Las Vegas, Nevada, United States
|
|-
|Win
|align=center|11–2
|Eddie Gordon 
|KO (head kick)
|UFC 181 
|
|align=center| 2
|align=center| 3:08
|Las Vegas, Nevada, United States
|
|-
|Win
|align=center|10–2
|Kevin Casey
|TKO (knees)
|The Ultimate Fighter: Team Jones vs. Team Sonnen Finale
|
|align=center|2
|align=center|2:17
|Las Vegas, Nevada, United States
|
|-
|Win
|align=center|9–2
|Mikey Gomez
|Submission (punches)
|XFC 16
|
|align=center|2
|align=center|2:17
|Knoxville, Tennessee, United States
|
|-
|Loss
|align=center|8–2
|Dan Cramer
|Decision (unanimous)
|Bellator 46
|
|align=center|3
|align=center|5:00
|Hollywood, Florida, United States
|
|-
|Win
|align=center|8–1
|John Walsh
|TKO (punches) 
|Moon Management: Ubersmash 4
|
|align=center|1
|align=center|1:19
|Tallahassee, Florida, United States
|
|-
|Win
|align=center|7–1
|David Baggett
|Submission (triangle choke)
|Moon Management: Ubersmash 3
|
|align=center|1
|align=center|1:20
|Tallahassee, Florida, United States
|
|-
|Win
|align=center|6–1
|Chris Cope
|KO (punches)
|Moon Management: Ubersmash 2
|
|align=center|1
|align=center|0:56
|Tallahassee, Florida, United States
|
|-
|Win
|align=center|5–1
|Colby McMahon
|TKO (punches)
|Moon Management: Ubersmash 1
|
|align=center|1
|align=center|2:23
|Tallahassee, Florida, United States
|
|-
|Win
|align=center|4–1
|Ryan Hodge
|Submission (choke) 
|WWCF: Blood War
|
|align=center|2
|align=center|2:41
|Ormond Beach, Florida, United States
|
|-
|Loss
|align=center|3–1
|John Walsh
|Submission (arm-triangle choke)
|ISCF: Unleashed
|
|align=center|1
|align=center|0:48
|North Carolina, United States
|
|-
|Win
|align=center|3–0
|Michael Shoffner
|TKO (punches)
|Reality Combat Championship 2: The Second Encounter
|
|align=center|1
|align=center|1:24
|Jacksonville, Florida, United States
|
|-
|Win
|align=center|2–0
|Michael Adams
|TKO (punches) 
|ISCF: Winnersville Wars
|
|align=center|2
|align=center|0:52
|Valdosta, Georgia, United States
|
|-
|Win
|align=center|1–0
|Travis Miller
|Decision (unanimous)
|Reality Combat Championship 1
|
|align=center|3
|align=center|5:00
|Jacksonville, Florida, United States
|

Mixed martial arts exhibition record

| Loss
|align=center| 3–1
|   Kelvin Gastelum
| Submission (rear-naked choke)
| The Ultimate Fighter: Team Jones vs. Team Sonnen
| 
|align=center| 1
| align=center| 4:03
| Las Vegas, Nevada, United States
| 
|-
| Win
|align=center| 3–0
|   Jimmy Quinlan
| Submission (punches)
| The Ultimate Fighter: Team Jones vs. Team Sonnen
| 
|align=center| 1
| align=center| 4:38
| Las Vegas, Nevada, United States
| 
|-
| Win
|align=center| 2–0
|  Tor Troeng
| KO (punches)
| The Ultimate Fighter: Team Jones vs. Team Sonnen
| 
|align=center| 1
|align=center| 4:02
| Las Vegas, Nevada, United States
| 
|-
| Win
|align=center| 1–0
| Lou Bercier 
| TKO (punches)
| The Ultimate Fighter: Team Jones vs. Team Sonnen
| 
|align=center| 1
|align=center| 1:49
| Las Vegas, Nevada, United States
|

See also
 List of male mixed martial artists

References

External links
 
 

1988 births
2016 deaths
American male mixed martial artists
American practitioners of Brazilian jiu-jitsu
Middleweight mixed martial artists
Mixed martial artists utilizing Brazilian jiu-jitsu
Mixed martial artists from Florida
Sportspeople from Orlando, Florida
Drug-related deaths in Florida
Ultimate Fighting Championship male fighters